The Mayor of Modena is an elected politician who, along with the Modena's City Council, is accountable for the strategic government of Modena in Emilia-Romagna, Italy.

The current Mayor is Gian Carlo Muzzarelli, a member of the Democratic Party, who took office on 10 June 2014.

Overview
According to the Italian Constitution, the Mayor of Modena is member of the City Council.

The Mayor is elected by the population of Modena, who also elect the members of the City Council, controlling the Mayor's policy guidelines and is able to enforce his resignation by a motion of no confidence. The Mayor is entitled to appoint and release the members of his government.

Since 1995 the Mayor is elected directly by Modena's electorate: in all mayoral elections in Italy in cities with a population higher than 15,000 the voters express a direct choice for the mayor or an indirect choice voting for the party of the candidate's coalition. If no candidate receives at least 50% of votes, the top two candidates go to a second round after two weeks. The election of the City Council is based on a direct choice for the candidate with a preference vote: the candidate with the majority of the preferences is elected. The number of the seats for each party is determined proportionally.

1859–1946

Republic of Italy (since 1946)

City Council election (1946–1995)
From 1946 to 1995, the Mayor of Modena was elected by the City Council.

Popular election (since 1995)
Since 1995, under provisions of new local administration law, the Mayor of Modena is chosen by popular election, originally every four and since 1999 every five years.

Timeline

See also
 Timeline of Modena

References

External links
 

Modena
 
Politics of Emilia-Romagna
Modena